This is a list of lists of dragons.

 List of dragons in mythology and folklore
 Dragons in Greek mythology
 Germanic dragon
 Slavic dragon
 European dragon
 Chinese dragon
 Japanese dragon
 Korean dragon
 List of dragons in popular culture
 List of dragons in film and television
 List of dragons in games
 List of dragons in literature

See also 
 List of fictional species